

Abọ foto

Ona Ara is a Local Government Area in Oyo State, Nigeria. Its headquarters are in the town of Akanran.

It has an area of 290 km and a population of 265,059 at the 2006 census.

The postal code of the area is 200.

References

Local Government Areas in Oyo State